Jong-won is a Korean given name. Notable people named Jong-won include:

Baek Jong-won (born 1966), South Korean chef
Choi Jong-won (born 1950), South Korean actor and politician
Chon Jong-won (born 1996), South Korean sport climber
Ha Jong-won (born 1942), North Korean football defender
Kim Jong-won (born 1975), South Korean judoka
Lee Jong-won (born 1969), South Korean actor
Lee Jong-won (actor, born 1994) (born 1994), South Korean actor and model
Lee Jong-won (footballer) (born 1989), South Korean football player
Lee Jong-won (volleyball) (born 1952), South Korean former volleyball player
Park Jong-won (director) (born 1960), South Korean film director and screenwriter
Park Jong-won (footballer) (born 1955), South Korean footballer

See also
Jung-won
Jungwon (disambiguation)